James Blackman (born November 14, 1998) is an American football quarterback who plays college football for the Arkansas State Red Wolves.

Career
Blackman played high school football at Glades Central High School in Belle Glade, Florida. Blackman committed to Florida State over offers from West Virginia and Louisville. He became the starting quarterback after Deondre Francois suffered a season-ending injury during the season opener against Alabama. Blackman became the first true freshman starting quarterback at FSU since Chip Ferguson in 1985. Despite the Seminoles being down 2–5 at one point in the season, Blackman was able to lead the team to a 6–6 record and an appearance in the 2017 Independence Bowl against Southern Mississippi. During the game, he threw four touchdown passes (three to Auden Tate and one to Cam Akers), setting an Independence Bowl record and netted the Offensive MVP.

On November 11, 2020 head coach Mike Norvell announced James Blackman will no longer be with the team and looking to transfer.

Statistics

References

External links
 Arkansas State bio

1998 births
Living people
American football quarterbacks
Arkansas State Red Wolves football players
Florida State Seminoles football players
People from Belle Glade, Florida
Players of American football from Florida